Karadon   coal mine is a coal mine in the Zonguldak basin in Turkey. The mine has an annual production capacity of 3.2 million tonnes of coal.

References

External links 

 Karadon coal mine on Global Energy Monitor

Coal mines in Turkey
Zonguldak Province